Anne Petrea Vik (born 8 January 1933 in Trondenes) is a Norwegian politician for the Centre Party.

From 1989 to 1990, while the cabinet Syse held office, Vik was appointed Minister of Agriculture.

On the local level she was a member of Kvæfjord municipal council from 1975 to 1975, and later served as deputy mayor from 1995 to 1999. From 1979 to 1987 she was a member of Troms county council.

From 1979 to 1984 she chaired the Centre Party Women's Association, during the same period she was a member of the Centre Party central party board. She was a member of the board of the Norwegian Agrarian Association from 1979 to 1984 and of Harstad University College from 1994 to 1997. She has also been involved in the Royal Norwegian Society for Development.

Outside politics she worked in Televerket from 1951 to 1955 and as a farmer from 1955 to 2001.

References

1933 births
Living people
People from Harstad
Ministers of Agriculture and Food of Norway
Centre Party (Norway) politicians
Troms politicians
Women government ministers of Norway